Nash Chase is a former pop singer from New Zealand who recorded for the Ode and HMV labels. He released a string of singles in the early 1970s. He is remembered for "What Greater Love", "Today I Killed a Man I Didn't Know" and "Anderson and Wise".

Background
Born in Taihape, Chase came from a very large family of at least 18. His brothers, Frank, Richard and Colin have been involved in music.
His brother Frank had a record released on the PYE label in 1969, "The Frog"/"Popeye Dance".
His youngest brother Colin Rex Chase was a Jazz drummer. Colin who also played in the A to Zeev Big Band, and funk band Jones Cartel, died of cancer on 10 March 2015.

Career

1970
In May 1970, along with Lyn Calman, and Tui Fox, Chase was one 15 entertainers selected from over a 1000 entries for Studio One's New Faces. In July of that year he won the Wanganui Talent Quest. In August, he won the 1970 New Faces competition. On the week ending with 5 September 1970, Billboard reported his single "What Greater Love" entering the New Zealand charts at position 10. The single backed with "Raindrops Keep Falling On My Head" was released on the Ode label. His previous single "Sound Of Love" backed with "My Special Prayer" was also released on Ode. In October 1970, Chase was photographed with competition winner Pam who had entered a promotional competition for the film Woodstock, which was organised by Kings Theatre in Wellington. The prize was tickets to the film's premiere, the 3 record LP soundtrack, and dinner with Chase.

1971
In April 1971, Chase and Lew Pryme appeared at Mt. Crawford Prison, and it was reported by Billboard that they were the first pop singers to so. In June 1971, his pressing "Today I Killed A Man I Didn't Know" was released on HMV. This was his first release for the label. The single was backed with "World Of Lavender Lace". Almost straight away, the single became a hit on the Top 20 chart. It also became a  finalist in the 1971 Loxene Gold Disc awards. He released another single that year on HMV. It was "If You'd Like To Be A Lady" backed with "Teresa".

1972 to 1974
In 1972, he had four singles released on HMV. They were "Eye For The Main Chance" bw "Bless Your Sweet Little Soul", "Anderson and Wise" bw "Fantasy", "Angel She Was Love" bw "To Hurt A Friend", and "Midnight Magic Man" bw " Fantasy". "Eye For The Main Chance", and "Anderson And Wise" did well, with the latter reaching the finals of the 1972 Studio One Contest.

His final single in the seventies was "Maria Isabella" bw "Spanish Eyes" in 1973.  It was released on the EMI label. It became a finalist in the 1973 RATA Awards. In February of that year, Chase and his wife relocated to Sydney, Australia. In June 1973, he appeared on part 4 of a Studio One series in a competition for the 1974 Commonwealth Games pop tune. Singing the song "Games Spirit", he was competing against "The Boy From Dundee", performed by Kamahl, "Country Spring" by Larry Philip, "Take My Life" by Desna Sisarich, "Natural Man" by Bunny Walters, and "What Do You Do" by Lutha. One of the singers he was competing against, Kamahl, was singing an Anderson and Wise composition. This was the same song-writing team (Ted Kaptiklis aka Ted Taptiklis and Tony Kaye) that wrote his hit "Anderson And Wise".

Chase made two appearances on The Ernie Sigley Show in 1974. The first was on 20 June. Bill and Boyd, Allison Durbin, Geraldine Fitzgerald, and Bronwyn Gordon appeared as well. Chase performed the "Rockin' Robin medley". The next time was on 22 August. Other guests included Yvonne Barrett, David Belcher, and Mary Ann Leyden. On that occasion he performed "My Woman, My Woman, My Wife".

1975 onwards
In August 1976, Chase was regularly appearing in a prestigious Sydney hotel bar as its resident artist, and his first Australian LP was ready for release the following month.

In 1998, his version of "Today I Killed A Man I Didn't Know" was included on the Vietnam Remembered various artists compilation.

Today Nash Chase is a life coach and meditation teacher.

Discography

Television

External links
AudioCulture profile

References

Year of birth missing (living people)
20th-century New Zealand male singers
Living people